Aethalida pasinuntia is a moth of the family Erebidae. It was described by Stoll in 1782. It is found in the southern Moluccas.

References

Moths described in 1782
Spilosomina
Moths of Indonesia